Arjunlal Meena  is a member of the Bharatiya Janata Party and was elected in the 2014 and 2019 Indian general elections from the Udaipur Lok Sabha constituency.

References

Living people
People from Udaipur district
India MPs 2014–2019
India MPs 2019–present
Lok Sabha members from Rajasthan
Bharatiya Janata Party politicians from Rajasthan
Year of birth missing (living people)
Meena people